The Eublepharidae are a family of geckos (Gekkota) consisting of 43 described species in six genera. They occur in Asia, Africa, North America, and Central America.  Eublepharid geckos lack adhesive toepads and, unlike other geckos, have movable eyelids, thus commonly called eyelid geckos. Like other members of Gekkota, the Eublepharidae exhibits tail autotomy due to the fracture planes near their vent. A new tail will then grow in its place, usually lacking the original color and texture. The muscles in the old tail will continue to flex for up to 30 minutes after the drop to distract predators. Leopard geckos (Eublepharis macularius) and African fat-tailed geckos (Hemitheconyx caudicinctus) are popular pet lizards.

Genera
The following genera are considered members of the Eublepharidae:

References 

 
Geckos
Lizard families
Taxa named by George Albert Boulenger